Ecsenius tricolor, known commonly as the Derawan combtooth-blenny in Indonesia, is a species of combtooth blenny in the genus Ecsenius. It is found in the western central Pacific ocean, around the Philippines and Borneo. It can reach a maximum length of 6 centimetres. Blennies in this species feed primarily off of plants, including benthic algae and weeds.

References
 Springer, V. G.  and G. R. Allen  2001. Ecsenius ops, from Indonesia, and E. tricolor from western Philippines and northwestern Kalimantan, new species of blenniid fishes in the stigmatura species group. Aqua, Journal of Ichthyology and Aquatic Biology v. 4 (no. 4): 151–160.

External links
 

tricolor
Fish described in 2001
Taxa named by Victor G. Springer
Taxa named by Gerald R. Allen